The Pleasant River is a river in Washington County, Maine. The river's mouth is on the border between the towns of Harrington and Addison.

See also
 List of rivers of Maine

References

 Maine Streamflow Data from the USGS
 Maine Watershed Data From Environmental Protection Agency

Rivers of Washington County, Maine
Rivers of Maine